Terrance 'Terry' Saville Hale (born 8 October 1936) is a former English cricketer.  Hale was a left-handed batsman.  He was born in Waterbeach, Cambridgeshire. 

Hale made his debut for Cambridgeshire in the 1957 Minor Counties Championship against Lincolnshire.  Hale played Minor counties cricket for Cambridgeshire from 1957 to 1978, which included 56 Minor Counties Championship matches.  In 1964, he made his List A debut against Essex in the Gillette Cup.  He played three further List A matches for Cambridgeshire, the last coming against Yorkshire in 1967.  In total his four List A matches, Hale scored 68 runs at a batting average of 17.00, with a single half century high score of 51.  This came against Essex in his debut List A match.

In 1965, Hales played his only first-class match for a combined Minor Counties team against the touring South Africans.  In this match he was dismissed for a duck in the Minor Counties first-innings by Jackie Botten and in their second-innings he scored 8 runs before being dismissed by Atholl McKinnon.

Terrance died peacefully at home with wife Susan by his side on October 14th 2021, shortly after celebrating his 85th birthday.

References

External links
Terry Hale at ESPNcricinfo
Terry Hale at CricketArchive

1936 births
Living people
Cambridgeshire cricketers
Cricketers from Cambridgeshire
English cricketers
Minor Counties cricketers
People from Waterbeach